KLXV may refer to:

 The ICAO airport code for Lake County Airport (Colorado)
 KLXV (FM), a radio station (91.9 FM) licensed to Glenwood Springs, Colorado, United States